Juan de la Cruz Mourgeón y Achet (died April 1822, in Quito) was a Spanish general and colonial administrator.

Biography  
He fought in the Spanish War of Independence against the French, and in the Viceroyalty of New Granada against rebels supporting independence. From 1819 to 1821 he was viceroy of New Granada — the last Spanish viceroy of the colony.

Cruz Mourgeón fought gallantly in the Peninsular War (Spanish War of Independence). He participated in the battles of Baylen (1808) and Bornos (1812). He was highly decorated for his services, becoming a knight of the military orders of San Fernando and San Hermenegildo, and Benemérito de la Patria (heroic grade), as well as receiving many medals.

He became the last (titular) viceroy of New Granada in 1819, serving until 1821, but the colony was in widespread, open revolt. He was also governor of Panama (August–October 1821). From there he organized an expedition to reconquer Quito, where he arrived in December. He proposed to free the slaves who would fight for the royalist forces. In early 1822 he wrote to Simon Bolívar, admitting the failure of Spain to reconquer its former colonies.

He died in Quito in April 1822.

External links
 Brief biography

Year of birth missing
1822 deaths
Viceroys of New Granada
Spanish generals
Laureate Cross of Saint Ferdinand
Spanish commanders of the Napoleonic Wars